Shitshow may refer to:
 "Shitshow", a song on the 2018 Death Grip album Year of the Snitch
 Sh*tshow!: The Country's Collapsing and the Ratings Are Great, a 2018 book by Charlie LeDuff
 "Shit Show", a song on the 2019 Green Day album Woodstock 1994
 The Shit Show, a radio show hosted by Andy Dick
 The Shit Show, a radio show hosted by Rob Huebel